Finnish Infantry Division Generic Organisation

1939

Division HQ
3 infantry regiments
Regiment HQ
3 infantry battalions
Battalion HQ
3 rifle companies
HQ platoon
4 rifle platoons
Machine gun company
Mortar company (81 mm)
Field artillery regiment
3 Field artillery battalions
Light detachment 
Bicycle company
Cavalry squadron
Machine gun platoon
2 Engineer companies
2 Signals companies
Supply formations

1941

Division HQ
3 infantry regiments
Regiment HQ
3 infantry battalions
Battalion HQ
3 rifle companies
HQ platoon
4 rifle platoons
Machine gun company
Mortar platoon (81 mm)
Mortar company (81 and 120 mm)
AT gun company
Field artillery regiment
3 Field artillery battalions
Heavy artillery battalion
AT gun company
Light detachment 
2 Jaeger companies
Machine gun company
Engineer battalion
Signals battalion
Supply formations
AA machine gun company

1944

Division HQ
2 infantry regiments
Regiment HQ
3 infantry battalions
Battalion HQ
3 rifle companies
HQ platoon
4 rifle platoons
Machine gun company
Mortar platoon (81 mm)
Mortar company (120 mm)
AT gun company
Separate battalion
Field artillery regiment
3 Field artillery battalions
Heavy artillery battalion
Mortar company (120 mm)
2 AT gun companies
Engineer battalion
Signals battalion
Supply formations
AAA Battalion

Military history of Finland